William Jacob Kramer (January 23, 1884 – February 29, 1964) was an American long-distance runner. He competed in the men's 10,000 metres at the 1912 Summer Olympics.

References

External links
 

1884 births
1964 deaths
Athletes (track and field) at the 1912 Summer Olympics
American male long-distance runners
Olympic track and field athletes of the United States
Place of birth missing
Olympic cross country runners
20th-century American people